Qabba'a was a Palestinian Arab village in the District of Safad. It was depopulated during the 1948 War on May 26, 1948, by the Palmach's First Battalion of Operation Yiftach. It was located 6 km northeast of Safad.

History
In 1596 the village appeared under the name of  Qabba'a in the Ottoman tax registers as part of the nahiya (subdistrict) of Jira, part of Safad Sanjak. It had an all  Muslim population, consisting of 11 households and 2  bachelors, an estimated 99 persons. The villagers  paid  a fixed tax rate of 20 % on agricultural products, including  as wheat, barley, olive trees, vineyards, goats and beehives, in addition to occasional revenues;  totalling 2,280 akçe.

The village appeared under the name of Koubaa on the map that Pierre Jacotin compiled during Napoleon's invasion of 1799.

In 1875 Victor Guérin found the village to have 120 Muslim inhabitants. 

In 1881  the PEF's Survey of Western Palestine described as Kabbaah:  "A masonry village, with a few caves to the south contains about 150 Moslems; situated on a ridge, with olives and arable land. Water from birket and good springs."

A population list from about 1887 showed  Kaba'ah to have  about 385 Muslim  inhabitants.

British Mandate era
In the 1922 census of Palestine, conducted by the  British Mandate authorities, Qaba'a  had a population of 179  Muslims,  increasing in the 1931 census when Kabba' had 256 Muslim inhabitants,  in  a total of 44  houses.

In the   1945 statistics  it had a population of 460 Muslims with a total land area of 13,817 dunums.   Of this,  379 dunums was  plantations and irrigable land, 7,966 were for  cereals, while 66 dunams were built-up (urban) land.

1948, aftermath
On 2 May 1948, Yigal Allon with Haganah launched an operation, conquering ‘Ein al Zeitun and Biriyya, and intimidating with mortar barrages the villages of Fir’im, Qabba‘a and Mughr al Kheit,  leading to a mass evacuation. Qabba'a finally became depopulated on May 26, 1948, after a military assault by Israeli forces.

In 1953, Hatzor HaGlilit was founded 3 km south of the village site, but not on village land.

In 1992 the village site was described: "The stone debris of destroyed houses covers the site, where shrubs, grass, cactuses, and fig and pine trees grow. Most of the surrounding land are cultivated by Israeli farmers, but some are wooded and others are used as pasture."

References

Bibliography

External links
Welcome To Qabba'a
 Qabba'a, Zochrot
  Qabba’a, Dr. Khalil Rizk
Survey of Western Palestine, Map 4: IAA, Wikimedia commons

Arab villages depopulated during the 1948 Arab–Israeli War
District of Safad